Roko Malani (died 1833) was high chief of the Fijian island of Lakeba. He held the title Tui Nayau (paramount chief of the Lau Islands) and was a popular chief. He increased the influence the island of Lakeba had in Fiji.

The first Christian missionaries arrived in Fiji in 1830 at Malani's request, these were three Tahitian missionaries of the London Missionary Society.

Malani's younger brother, Taliai Tupou, succeeded him as Tui Nayau after Malani's death in 1833. Malani's son, Vuetasau, was among the first Fijians to convert to Christianity.

References

Sources 
 
 
 

Fijian chiefs
Politics of Fiji
Tui Nayau
1833 deaths
People from Lakeba